Krishna Lee Stanton (née Wood; born 18 May 1966) is an Australian former distance runner. She finished fourth in the 3000 metres at the 1987 IAAF World Indoor Championships and went on to win the silver medal in the marathon at the 2002 Commonwealth Games. She also competed at the 1992 Barcelona Olympics. A four-time Australian champion, she won the 3000 metres title in 1990 and 1993, the 15 km in 1990 and the marathon in 2001.

International competitions

References

1966 births
Living people
Australian female long-distance runners
Australian female marathon runners
Olympic athletes of Australia
Athletes (track and field) at the 1992 Summer Olympics
Athletes (track and field) at the 2002 Commonwealth Games
Athletes (track and field) at the 1994 Commonwealth Games
World Athletics Championships athletes for Australia
Commonwealth Games medallists in athletics
Commonwealth Games silver medallists for Australia
Australian female cross country runners
20th-century Australian women
Medallists at the 2002 Commonwealth Games